Jorge Gaggero is an Argentinian film director, and screenwriter.

He works in the cinema of Argentina.

Filmography
 Sólo cuando respiro (1994)
 Ojos de fuego (1995)
 Un Pedazo de tierra (2001)  A Piece of Earth
 The Secret Sea (2002)
 Cama Adentro (2004) a.k.a. Live-In Maid
 Vida en Falcon (2005)
 Montenegro (2011)

References

External links
 

Argentine film directors
Argentine screenwriters
Male screenwriters
Argentine male writers
Year of birth missing (living people)
Living people
Place of birth missing (living people)